Social Creatures is a 2013 American zombie apocalypse themed play by Jackie Sibblies Drury.

Productions
The play had its world premiere at Trinity Rep, Providence, Rhode Island in March 2013. The play was commissioned by Trinity Rep; Jackie Sibblies Drury was in residence there. The play was directed by Curt Columbus, who said "I knew that Jackie's interest lay not in creating a traditional zombie thriller - although there will be plenty of blood for those that are hoping for that - but also questioning our true nature, and where the true monsters are found."

Plot
A handful of survivors in an abandoned building must deal with a zombie apocalypse.

References

2013 plays
American plays
Comedy plays
Horror plays
African-American plays